The Vulamehlo Local Municipality council consisted of twenty members elected by mixed-member proportional representation. Ten councillors were elected by first-past-the-post voting in ten wards, while the remaining ten were chosen from party lists so that the total number of party representatives was proportional to the number of votes received. In the election of 18 May 2011 the African National Congress (ANC) won a majority of thirteen seats on the council.

In 2016 the municipality was divided between eThekwini and uMdoni.

Results 
The following table shows the composition of the council after past elections.

December 2000 election

The following table shows the results of the 2000 election.

March 2006 election

The following table shows the results of the 2006 election.

May 2011 election

The following table shows the results of the 2011 election.

References

Vulamehlo
Elections in KwaZulu-Natal
Ugu District Municipality